Marco Frediani (born 14 March 1994) is an Italian professional football winger who plays for  club Siena.

Club career

Early career
Frediani began his career at S.S. Romulea in his native Rome, Italy. In 2005, he was signed by Serie A giants Roma, to play in their youth teams. He progressed through the youth teams until 2013, making fifty appearances for the Primavera side in total.

Loan moves
Frediani made the jump from Primavera side to professional sides in 2013, when he was loaned to Lega Pro (then Prima Divisione) side L'Aquila. He was a regular in the side, making 32 appearances and scoring 4 goals. Upon his return to Roma, he made another loan move, this time to Pisa of the same division. Again, he made several appearances and managed to score a further 2 goals, along with 4 assists. He returned to Roma after two positive seasons, but was still unable to break into the first team. He made another loan move, this time to Serie B side Ascoli. In this higher division, Frediani struggled to get playing time and only made two appearances for the Marche side in 6 months. Returning to Roma in the winger transfer window in January 2016, he was signed to an 18-month loan by Ancona, returning to Lega Pro midway through the 2015-16 season and for the entirety of the 2016-17 season. He made his debut for Ancona on 13 March 2016, playing 42 minutes in a 0–0 draw against Arezzo. After being red-carded in a game against Siena, and serving a three-game suspension, Frediani began to play more regularly for Ancona, and managed to score his first goal for the club against Modena on 24 September 2016, before netting 4 more and registering an assist in the next 15 games.

Parma

Loan to Sambenedettese
On 1 August 2019 he joined Sambenedettese on loan.

Alessandria
On 2 October 2020, he signed a two-year contract with Alessandria.

Fermana
On 31 August 2021, he moved to Fermana on a two-year deal.

Siena
On 16 July 2022, Frediani joined Siena on a two-year contract.

References

External links

1994 births
Living people
Footballers from Rome
Italian footballers
Italy youth international footballers
Association football midfielders
Serie B players
Serie C players
A.S. Roma players
L'Aquila Calcio 1927 players
Pisa S.C. players
Ascoli Calcio 1898 F.C. players
U.S. Ancona 1905 players
Parma Calcio 1913 players
Ternana Calcio players
A.S. Sambenedettese players
U.S. Alessandria Calcio 1912 players
Fermana F.C. players
A.C.N. Siena 1904 players